Tavrichesky (masculine), Tavricheskaya (feminine), or Tavricheskoye (neutral) is the name of several inhabited localities in Russia.

Urban localities
Tavricheskoye, Omsk Oblast, a work settlement in Tavrichesky District of Omsk Oblast

Rural localities
Tavrichesky, Rostov Oblast, a khutor in Nosovskoye Rural Settlement of Neklinovsky District of Rostov Oblast
Tavrichesky, Stavropol Krai, a settlement in Kulikovo-Kopansky Selsoviet of Turkmensky District of Stavropol Krai
Tavricheskoye, Krasnodar Krai, a selo in Srednechuburksky Rural Okrug of Kushchyovsky District of Krasnodar Krai